Unstoppable is the soundtrack to the 2010 film of the same name, directed by Tony Scott. It was composed by Harry Gregson-Williams. It was released on December 7, 2010 by La-La Land Records and Fox Music.

Track listing

Not included in the soundtrack
 "Hasta Abajo (Don Omar song)" by Don Omar
 The song is used at ending of the film particularly at the pre-credits epilogue montage in the Complete Edition.
 "Work" by Ciara featuring Missy Elliott
 The song is used at some parts of the film, particularly at the pre-credits epilogue montage.
 "Country Boy" by Alan Jackson
 The song is used during Ned's introduction.

References

2010 soundtrack albums
Harry Gregson-Williams soundtracks
La-La Land Records soundtracks